Sacramento National Forest  is a former National Forest in southern New Mexico.  The Forest was established by Presidential proclamation on April 24, 1907 to preserve the timber-rich lands in the southern Sacramento Mountains around Cloudcroft and Mayhill. Led by inaugural Forest Supervisor C. H. Hinderer, the forest was headquartered in Alamogordo.
Fourteen months later, on July 2, 1908, President Roosevelt issued Executive Order 908. which consolidated the Sacramento with the nearby Guadalupe National Forest to create the Alamo National Forest.
Arthur M. Neal, the last supervisor of the independent Guadalupe forest became the initial supervisor for the new Alamo National Forest, with his headquarters in Alamogordo.  Under this new administrative scheme the former Sacramento National Forest was divided into a number of individual Ranger Districts within the Alamo National Forest, including Fresnal, La Luz, Mayhill, and Weed.
On June 6, 1917, President Woodrow Wilson issued Executive Order 2633, which disestablished the Alamo National Forest and transferred all of its lands to the nearby Lincoln National Forest.
As a result of this order, some areas of the former Sacramento National Forest, like La Luz Ranger District, lost their independent status, others were renamed, such as the Fresnal district, which became the Cloudcroft Ranger District, and others, like Mayhill and Weed, retained their original names and designations. In 1961, the Cloudcroft, Mayhill and Weed Ranger Districts were consolidated and given their current designation, the Sacramento Ranger District of the Lincoln National Forest.

See also
Alamo National Forest
Guadalupe National Forest
Lincoln National Forest

References

External links
Lincoln National Forest
Forest History Society

Former National Forests of New Mexico
Protected areas of Chaves County, New Mexico
Protected areas of Otero County, New Mexico
Lincoln National Forest
1907 establishments in New Mexico Territory
Protected areas established in 1907
1908 disestablishments in New Mexico Territory
Protected areas disestablished in 1908